Kevin Hallett (13 October 1929 – 11 October 2021) was an Australian swimmer. He competed in the men's 200 metre breaststroke at the 1948 Summer Olympics.

References

External links
 

1929 births
2021 deaths
Olympic swimmers of Australia
Swimmers at the 1948 Summer Olympics
Place of birth missing
Australian male breaststroke swimmers
People from the Hunter Region
Sportsmen from New South Wales
20th-century Australian people